The Kids in the Shoe is a 1935 short animated film produced by Max Fleischer. It is a humorous retelling of the classic nursery rhyme. This short film was released on May 19, 1935, as part of the Color Classics collection.

Synopsis 
In the shoe, the woman and her children are shown on their daily lives. Curiously enough, all of the children look identical with the exception of the youngest child, whom the woman tends to personally. It is shown that the children are rebellious by nature, purposefully giving their meals to the cat and avoiding their combing and tooth brushing. "You didn't eat your broth and you didn't eat your bread, so go ahead and brush and hurry into bed!" yells the woman to the kids.

After the children are sent to sleep, they begin a rowdy song and the situation becomes happy but highly chaotic. The woman later wakes up and threatens them to feed them castor oil if they don't go to sleep, which they happily comply with.

The woman reveals that the castor oil was simply apple cider which she energetically drinks.

Cast 
Smiley Burnette - Kid (singing voice) (uncredited)
Mae Questel - Woman, Children

References

Great Depression films
Color Classics cartoons
Fleischer Studios short films
Paramount Pictures short films
Films based on nursery rhymes
Short films directed by Dave Fleischer
1935 animated films
1935 short films
1930s English-language films
American comedy short films
American animated short films
Films about children